Bartosz Łeszyk  (born 4 December 1980 in Poznań) is a Polish futsal player who plays for Akademia Futsal Club. He has represented the Poland national futsal team multiple times, including qualifying matches for the 2007 UEFA Futsal Championship.

He has also played 11-a-side football for Warta Poznań and Lechita Kłecko in Poland.

References

1980 births
Living people
Polish men's futsal players
Sportspeople from Poznań